Abu Hafs Umar (Abū Ḥafṣ ʿUmar) may refer to:

Abu Hafs Umar al-Iqritishi (died 855), surnamed al-Ghaliz and al-Iqritishi, Muslim pirate
Abu Hafs Umar al-Nasafi (1067–1142), Muslim jurist and theologian
Abu Hafs Umar al-Murtada (died 1266), Almohad caliph
Abu Hafs Umar bin Yahya (died 1295), Hafsid caliph